In algebraic topology, singular homology refers to the study of a certain set of algebraic invariants of a topological space X, the so-called homology groups   Intuitively, singular homology counts, for each dimension n, the n-dimensional holes of a space.  Singular homology is a particular example of a homology theory, which has now grown to be a rather broad collection of theories.  Of the various theories, it is perhaps one of the simpler ones to understand, being built on fairly concrete constructions (see also the related theory simplicial homology).

In brief, singular homology is constructed by taking maps of the standard n-simplex to a topological space, and composing them into formal sums, called singular chains.  The boundary operation – mapping each n-dimensional simplex to its (n−1)-dimensional boundary – induces the singular chain complex.  The singular homology is then the homology of the chain complex.  The resulting homology groups are the same for all homotopy equivalent spaces, which is the reason for their study.  These constructions can be applied to all topological spaces, and so singular homology is expressible as a functor from the category of topological spaces to the category of graded abelian groups.

Singular simplices 

A singular n-simplex in a topological space X is a continuous function (also called a map)  from the standard n-simplex  to X, written   This map need not be injective, and there can be non-equivalent singular simplices with the same image in X.

(A formal sum is an element of the free abelian group on the simplices. The basis for the group is the infinite set of all possible singular simplices. The group operation is "addition" and the sum of simplex a with simplex b is usually simply designated a + b, but a + a = 2a and so on. Every simplex a has a negative −a.) Thus, if we designate  by its vertices

corresponding to the vertices  of the standard n-simplex  (which of course does not fully specify the singular simplex produced by ), then

is a formal sum of the faces of the simplex image designated in a specific way.

Singular chain complex 
The usual construction of singular homology proceeds by defining formal sums of simplices, which may be understood to be elements of a free abelian group, and then showing that we can define a certain group, the homology group of the topological space, involving the boundary operator.

Consider first the set of all possible singular n-simplices  on a topological space X.  This set may be used as the basis of a free abelian group, so that each singular n-simplex is a generator of the group. This set of generators is of course usually infinite, frequently uncountable, as there are many ways of mapping a simplex into a typical topological space.

The boundary  is readily extended to act on singular n-chains.  The extension, called the boundary operator, written as

is a homomorphism of groups.

It can also be shown that , implying .

Homotopy invariance 

If X and Y are two topological spaces with the same homotopy type (i.e. are homotopy equivalent), then

for all n ≥ 0.  This means homology groups are homotopy invariants, and therefore topological invariants.

In particular, if X is a connected contractible space, then all its homology groups are 0, except .

A proof for the homotopy invariance of singular homology groups can be sketched as follows.  A continuous map f: X → Y induces a homomorphism

It can be verified immediately that

i.e. f# is a chain map, which descends to homomorphisms on homology

We now show that if f and g are homotopically equivalent, then f* = g*.  From this follows that if f is a homotopy equivalence, then f* is an isomorphism.

Let F : X × [0, 1] → Y be a homotopy that takes f to g.  On the level of chains, define a homomorphism

that, geometrically speaking, takes a basis element σ: Δn → X of Cn(X) to the "prism" P(σ): Δn × I → Y.  The boundary of P(σ) can be expressed as

So if α in Cn(X) is an n-cycle, then f#(α ) and g#(α) differ by a boundary:

i.e. they are homologous.  This proves the claim.

Homology groups of common spaces 
The table below shows the k-th homology groups  of n-dimensional real projective spaces RPn, complex projective spaces, CPn, a point, spheres Sn(), and a 3-torus T3 with integer coefficients.

Functoriality
The construction above can be defined for any topological space, and is preserved by the action of continuous maps.  This generality implies that singular homology theory can be recast in the language of  category theory.  In particular, the homology group can be understood to be a functor from the category of topological spaces Top to the category of abelian groups Ab.

Consider first that  is a map from topological spaces to free abelian groups.  This suggests that  might be taken to be a functor, provided one can understand its action on the morphisms of Top.  Now, the morphisms of Top are continuous functions, so if  is a continuous map of topological spaces, it can be extended to a homomorphism of groups

by defining

This shows that  is a functor

from the category of topological spaces to the category of abelian groups.

The boundary operator commutes with continuous maps, so that .  This allows the entire chain complex to be treated as a functor.  In particular, this shows that the map  is a functor

from the category of topological spaces to the category of abelian groups.  By the homotopy axiom, one has that  is also a functor, called the homology functor, acting on hTop, the quotient homotopy category:

This distinguishes singular homology from other homology theories, wherein  is still a functor, but is not necessarily defined on all of Top.  In some sense, singular homology is the "largest" homology theory, in that every homology theory on a subcategory of Top agrees with singular homology on that subcategory.  On the other hand, the singular homology does not have the cleanest categorical properties; such a cleanup motivates the development of other homology theories such as cellular homology.

More generally, the homology functor is defined axiomatically, as a functor on an abelian category, or, alternately, as a functor on chain complexes, satisfying axioms that require a boundary morphism that turns short exact sequences into long exact sequences.  In the case of singular homology, the homology functor may be factored into two pieces, a topological piece and an algebraic piece.  The topological piece is given by

Here, then,  is understood to be the singular chain functor, which maps topological spaces to the category of chain complexes Comp (or Kom). The category of chain complexes has chain complexes as its objects, and chain maps as its morphisms.

The second, algebraic part is the homology functor

which maps

and takes chain maps to maps of abelian groups.  It is this homology functor that may be defined axiomatically, so that it stands on its own as a functor on the category of chain complexes.

Homotopy maps re-enter the picture by defining homotopically equivalent chain maps.  Thus, one may define the quotient category hComp or K, the homotopy category of chain complexes.

Coefficients in R 
Given any unital ring R, the set of singular n-simplices on a topological space can be taken to be the generators of a free R-module.  That is, rather than performing the above constructions from the starting point of free abelian groups, one instead uses free R-modules in their place.  All of the constructions go through with little or no change.  The result of this is

which is now an R-module.  Of course, it is usually not a free module.  The usual homology group is regained by noting that

when one takes the ring to be the ring of integers.  The notation Hn(X; R) should not be confused with the nearly identical notation Hn(X, A), which denotes  the relative homology (below).

The universal coefficient theorem provides a mechanism to calculate the homology with R coefficients in terms of homology with usual integer coefficients using the short exact sequence

where Tor is the Tor functor.

Relative homology

For a subspace , the relative homology Hn(X, A) is understood to be the homology of the quotient of the chain complexes, that is,

where the quotient of chain complexes is given by the short exact sequence

Reduced homology

For the usual homology defined on a chain complex:

where . This can be justified by interpreting the empty set as "(-1)-simplex", which means that . 

For n > 0, while for n = 0,

Cohomology 

By dualizing the homology chain complex (i.e. applying the functor Hom(-, R), R being any ring) we obtain a cochain complex with coboundary map .  The cohomology groups of X are defined as the homology groups of this complex; in a quip, "cohomology is the homology of the co [the dual complex]".

The cohomology groups have a richer, or at least more familiar, algebraic structure than the homology groups.  Firstly, they form a differential graded algebra as follows:
 the graded set of groups form a graded R-module;
 this can be given the structure of a graded R-algebra using the cup product;
 the Bockstein homomorphism β gives a differential.
There are additional cohomology operations, and the cohomology algebra has addition structure mod p (as before, the mod p cohomology is the cohomology of the mod p cochain complex, not the mod p reduction of the cohomology), notably the Steenrod algebra structure.

Betti homology and cohomology

Since the number of homology theories has become large (see :Category:Homology theory), the terms Betti homology and Betti cohomology are sometimes applied (particularly by authors writing on algebraic geometry) to the singular theory, as giving rise to the Betti numbers of the most familiar spaces such as simplicial complexes and closed manifolds.

Extraordinary homology

If one defines a homology theory axiomatically (via the Eilenberg–Steenrod axioms), and then relaxes one of the axioms (the dimension axiom), one obtains a generalized theory, called an extraordinary homology theory.  These originally arose in the form of extraordinary cohomology theories, namely K-theory and cobordism theory.  In this context, singular homology is referred to as ordinary homology.

See also
 Derived category
 Excision theorem
 Hurewicz theorem
 Simplicial homology
 Cellular homology

References

 Allen Hatcher, Algebraic topology. Cambridge University Press,  and 
 J.P. May, A Concise Course in Algebraic Topology, Chicago University Press 
 Joseph J. Rotman, An Introduction to Algebraic Topology, Springer-Verlag, 

Homology theory